The Copa del Bicentenario de la Independencia was an official Argentine football cup competition organized by the Argentine Football Association (AFA), being contested by the 2014 Torneo de Transición champions, Racing and the 2016 champions, Lanús. 

A draw by AFA was held to decide the home team (Racing).
The trophy was named to honour the 200th. anniversary of the Independence of Argentina.

Lanús beat Racing 1–0 in Avellaneda in injury time and won the trophy. As champions, Lanús qualified to the 2017 Copa Sudamericana.

Venue

Match

Details

Statistics

References 

B
2016 in Argentine football
Football in Avellaneda